The 2016 British Columbia Scotties Tournament of Hearts, the provincial women's curling championship of British Columbia, was held from January 19 to 24 at Coquitlam Curling Club in Coquitlam, British Columbia. The winning Karla Thompson team represented British Columbia at the 2016 Scotties Tournament of Hearts in Grande Prairie, Alberta

Teams
The teams were listed as follows:

Round robin standings

Results
Round robin results are as follows:

January 19
Draw 1
Knezevic 5-4 Van Osch
Scott 6-3 Gushulak  
Wark 9-7 Gibson 
Thompson 8-5 Russett

January 20
Draw 2
Thompson 9-6 Gushulak
Van Osch 7-5 Gibson  
Scott 8-2 Russett 
Wark 9-6 Knezevic

Draw 3
Van Osch 5-4 Russett
Scott 7-3 Wark
Thompson 9-7 Knezevic   
Gushulak 8-4 Gibson

January 21
Draw 4
Gibson 9-7 Scott
Russett 9-5 Knezevic
Gushulak 7-2 Wark 
Thompson 7-4 Van Osch

Draw 5
Gushulak 7-3 Knezevic
Thompson 7-6 Wark   
Scott 7-1 Van Osch
Gibson 9-5 Russett

January 22
Draw 6
Wark 9-3 Russett  
Van Osch 9-3 Gushulak
Gibson 11-7 Thompson   
Scott 8-6 Knezevic

Draw 7
Scott 8-7 Thompson
Knezevic 9-4 Gibson
Gushulak 6-5 Russett
Wark 10-4 Van Osch

Playoffs

1 vs 2
Saturday, January 23, 2:00 pm

3 vs 4
Sunday, January 23, 10:30 pm

Semifinal
Sunday, January 24, 2:00 pm

Final
Sunday, January 24, 7:00 pm

References

External links
Official site

2016 Scotties Tournament of Hearts
Curling in British Columbia
2016 in British Columbia
Sport in Coquitlam